Ken Fowler (15 March 1907 in Fargo, North Dakota – 16 January 1981 in St. James City, Florida) was an American racecar driver.

He was married to Frances Reta, and had one son, Robert Frances, with her. He died from lung cancer, with his wife at his side.

Indy 500 results

References

Indianapolis 500 drivers
Sportspeople from Fargo, North Dakota
1907 births
1981 deaths
Racing drivers from North Dakota